The National Front of Australia (NFA) was an Australia nationalist and anti-immigrant organisation that existed from 1977 to 1984. It was an initiative of John Tyndall of the British National Front but received no funding from the British NF.

History
The NFA was established originally in 1977 as a sister organisation of the British National Front; sister organisations were also formed in New Zealand and South Africa at the same time. It did not become fully operative until 1978.

NFA followed Tyndall's British imperial view and called for a “regenerated British Australia”. Like the sister organisations, it sought to align itself with other right-wing and racist groups. However, its British Australian nationalism and anti-immigrant stance separated it from the more Europeanist/Americanist 'white race' neo-Nazi far-right that was emerging in Australia, many of whose members were themselves immigrants rather than of British origin.

The first party chairman was Rosemary Sisson. Branches were formed in Victoria, with Sisson as branch secretary; in Queensland, with Victor Robb as branch secretary; and in New South Wales with neo-Nazi Robert Cameron as branch secretary. Divisions emerged between the Victoria and New South Wales branches. Cameron was later joined by fellow neo-Nazi Ross "the skull" May during the 1980s. Cameron was accused of being an "informer-provocateur" and that his presence discredited the party as a 'respectable' right-wing party.

From June 1978 the party published a magazine called Frontline, in collaboration with the National Front of New Zealand.

Victor Robb was the party's first electoral candidate in 1978. He "campaigned at the time on a platform of making Australia racially pure".  Sisson and Robb stood for the party in the 1980 federal election in Queensland.

Sisson attended the British National Front's AGM in 1978. Following John Tyndall's departure from the British National Front in 1980, the NFA supported the New National Front.

The party ceased in 1984. After the demise of the party Frontline continued to March 1987 in support of a more general non-party "nationalist cause".

Federal parliament

See also
 British National Front
 New Zealand National Front
 South African National Front

References 

Political parties established in 1977
Defunct political parties in Australia
Neo-Nazi political parties
Neo-Nazism in Australia
Anti-immigration politics in Australia
Defunct far right political parties in Australia
1977 establishments in Australia
1984 disestablishments in Australia
Political parties disestablished in 1984